Black Bear Diner is a restaurant chain in the Western United States which serves homestyle and "old-fashioned" comfort foods. The first restaurant was opened in Mount Shasta, California in 1995, founded by Bruce Dean and Bob & Laurie Manley. The company is based in Redding, California. As of September 2020, Black Bear Diner has 143 locations in 14 states.

Black Bear decor has a rustic motif with "over-the-top bear paraphernalia." Every restaurant is decorated with a  black bear carving by artist Ray Schulz. Additional murals and artwork are created for each restaurant by Steve and Gary Fitzgerald and Colleen Mitchell-Veyna. The menu format mimics an old newspaper titled The Black Bear Gazette, with articles on the front page. The children's menu is similarly styled with the title The Beary Tale Times and features children's activities. It offers family meals such as breakfast, burgers, salads, and shakes. Baked goods prepared on site are offered, and some locations offer alcohol sales, provided the customer is at least 21.

Gallery

References

External links
 

1995 establishments in California
Regional restaurant chains in the United States
Companies based in Shasta County, California
Redding, California
Restaurants in California
Diners in the United States
Buildings and structures in Redding, California